Vol. 1 is the sixth studio album by Nekropolis, released independently in 2003.

Track listing

Personnel 
Adapted from the Vol. 1 liner notes.
 Matthias Friedrich – violin
 Peter Frohmader – five-string bass guitar, fretless bass guitar, cover art
 Udo Gerhards – piano, synthesizer, harmonium
 Holger Röder – drums, cymbal

Release history

References 

2003 albums
Nekropolis albums